Santa Marta Province was a province of New Granada.

Provinces of the Republic of New Granada